Anton Anatoliiovych Babchuk (born May 6, 1984) is a Ukrainian-Russian former professional ice hockey defenceman He last played for Atlant Moscow Oblast of the Kontinental Hockey League (KHL).

Babchuk was a first round selection, 21st overall, of the Chicago Blackhawks at the 2002 NHL Entry Draft, and played for the Blackhawks, Carolina Hurricanes, and Calgary Flames in his NHL career. He also played with Ak Bars Kazan, SKA Saint Petersburg, Avangard Omsk, HC Donbass, Salavat Yulaev Ufa and Torpedo Nizhny Novgorod of the Kontinental Hockey League (formerly the Russian Super League).

Playing career
Originally from Kyiv, Ukraine, Babchuk began playing hockey at the age of three. He began his training with the Sokil Kyiv junior hockey affiliate, a team which included fellow future Ukrainian NHLer Nikolai Zherdev. He played in the 1998 Quebec International Pee-Wee Hockey Tournament with a youth team from Kyiv. While participating in the tournament, Babchuk's team found itself competing against a team from Elektrostal, Russia. The rival team's coach, Ravil Iskakhov, took note of both Babchuk and Zherdev, and invited the pair to further their development with the Elemash Elektrostal hockey club of the Russian Major League, to which they accepted together.

He was drafted into the National Hockey League (NHL) 21st overall by the Chicago Blackhawks in the 2002 Entry Draft. Babchuk made his North American debut with the Blackhawks affiliate, the Norfolk Admirals of the American Hockey League (AHL), in the 2003–04 season. Babchuk also made his NHL debut by season's end, appearing in five games with the Blackhawks.

In the 2005–06 season, Babchuk was traded to the Carolina Hurricanes for Danny Richmond on January 20, 2006. Babchuk scored his first goal for the Hurricanes on January 28, 2006. He was also named second star of the game. Babchuk played in 22 games with the Hurricanes for the season and was a part of the extended squad of the Hurricanes as they became the Stanley Cup Champions. After winning the Cup, Babchuk took it with him to Kyiv, Ukraine, and celebrated with teammate Oleg Tverdovsky. "I wish hockey was as popular as soccer in Ukraine," he told those in attendance. "If it was, I gladly would have played for a team in Kyiv."

In the 2006–07 season, on February 6, 2007, the Hurricanes activated František Kaberle from injury, forcing them to send Babchuk down to the Albany River Rats. Babchuk was the only possible defenceman they could send down because he was the only one on the Hurricanes' roster that was not subject to waiver wire claims. The next day, Carolina announced that they had suspended Babchuk because of his refusal to report to Albany. In 2007–08, Babchuk played in the Russian Superleague (RSL) for Avangard Omsk.

On July 1, 2008, Babchuk re-signed with the Hurricanes to a one-year contract for the 2008–09 season. He led all Hurricanes' defensemen with 16 goals in 72 games. Following a contract dispute that lead to him requesting a trade out of Carolina, Babchuk turned back to Russia on 19 September 2009, re-signing with Kontinental Hockey League (KHL) club Avangard Omsk. During the very first training day in Omsk, he broke the ice rink glass with a shot at Arena Omsk.
Babchuk was chosen to play on Team Yashin at the 2nd Kontinental Hockey League All-Star Game.

On July 1, 2010, Babchuk re-signed with the Carolina Hurricanes to a one-year contract worth $1.4 million.

On November 17, 2010, Babchuk was traded along with Tom Kostopoulos to the Calgary Flames for Ian White and Brett Sutter.

On July 4, 2011, Babchuk re-signed with the Flames for two years, at $2.5 million per season. Following the 2012 NHL lockout, he signed in his native Ukraine with HC Donbass along with fellow Ukrainian NHL players Ruslan Fedotenko and Alexei Ponikarovsky.

Career statistics

Regular season and playoffs

International

References

External links
 
 

1984 births
Living people
Ak Bars Kazan players
Albany River Rats players
Avangard Omsk players
Calgary Flames players
Carolina Hurricanes players
Chicago Blackhawks draft picks
Chicago Blackhawks players
Atlant Moscow Oblast players
HC Donbass players
Kristall Elektrostal players
Lowell Lock Monsters players
National Hockey League first-round draft picks
Norfolk Admirals players
Salavat Yulaev Ufa players
Sportspeople from Kyiv
Russian ice hockey defencemen
Naturalised citizens of Russia
SKA Saint Petersburg players
Stanley Cup champions
Torpedo Nizhny Novgorod players
Ukrainian ice hockey defencemen
Russian expatriate sportspeople in the United States
Russian expatriate sportspeople in Canada
Russian expatriate ice hockey people
Ukrainian expatriate ice hockey people
Ukrainian expatriate sportspeople in the United States
Ukrainian expatriate sportspeople in Canada
Expatriate ice hockey players in the United States
Expatriate ice hockey players in Canada